Mark Lilley (born 12 October 1987) is an English Rugby Union player who plays for London Scottish on loan from Bristol in the RFU Championship. He made his debut for his former club Bath Rugby off the bench on 31 October 2009 against Saracens. His preferred position is prop, but he can also play hooker. He has also played for Somerset U18 and England U20. At the beginning of the 2012–13 season, Mark Lilley signed a permanent deal to leave Bath for Bristol, although he was a product of the Bath Academy.

References
 Bath sign up forwards Scott Hobson and Mark Lilley – BBC Sport. 18 March 2010. Retrieved 1 June 2010

External links
 Bath Player Profile

1987 births
Living people
English rugby union players
London Scottish F.C. players
Bath Rugby players
Bristol Bears players
Rugby union players from Bath, Somerset
Rugby union props